This is a list of notable George Washington University faculty, including both current and past faculty at the Washington, D.C. school, as well as university officials. Presidents John Quincy Adams and Ulysses Grant served on the Board of Trustees. Professors have been government officials, leading scientists, and others. Edward Teller, a physicist considered the father of the hydrogen bomb taught at GW. Frank Sesno, a CNN Special Correspondent, currently teaches in that field and, from 2009 to 2020, was the director of the School of Media and Public Affairs. The current President of the University is Thomas LeBlanc.

Current faculty

Business
 Herman Aguinis -- Avram Tucker Distinguished Scholar and Professor of Management, and Past President of the Academy of Management
 Hossein Askari – professor of international business
 Annamaria Lusardi --University Professor of Economics & Accountancy
 Stuart Umpleby –  professor emeritus in the Department of Management 
 Sandiaga Uno – Distinguished Research Professor in Residence in the School of Business, Deputy Governor of Jakarta
 Cevat Tosun -- Eisenhower Chair and Professor of Tourism Studies and Management

Humanities
 Peter Caws – Professor of Philosophy
 Seyyed Hossein Nasr – Founder and first president of the Imperial Iranian Academy of Philosophy, scholar of comparative religion
 Jane Shore – poet

International affairs

 Michael Barnett – University Professor
 Nathan J. Brown – former director of the Institute for Middle East Studies
 Amitai Etzioni – former president of the American Sociological Association
 Henry Farrell
 Martha Finnemore – leader of the constructivist school of international relations theory
 Leon Fuerth – former National Security Adviser to Vice President Al Gore
 Edward "Skip" Gnehm – former U.S. Ambassador to Jordan, Kuwait and Australia
 Karl Inderfurth – former Assistant Secretary of State for South and Central Asian Affairs
 Marc Lynch – director of the Institute for Middle East Studies
 Thomas E. McNamara – former Assistant Secretary of State for Political-Military Affairs
 Eric Newsom – former Assistant Secretary of State for Political-Military Affairs
 Scott Pace – director of the Space Policy Institute
 Lawrence Wilkerson – former Chief of Staff to United States Secretary of State Colin Powell
 Stephen C. Smith – professor of economics and international affairs

Journalism and public affairs
 Dana Perino – former White House Press Secretary in the George W. Bush Administration
 Steven V. Roberts – journalist, writer, and commentator
 Frank Sesno – CNN correspondent

Law
 Clarence Thomas – current Associate Justice of the Supreme Court of the United States
 Thomas Buergenthal – former professor of international and comparative law and jurisprudence, presently the American judge on the International Court of Justice
 Steve Charnovitz – professor of law, member of the Council on Foreign Relations
 Spencer Overton – professor of law, former U.S. Attorney, top bundler for Barack Obama, member of President-elect Obama's Justice Department Review Team
 Jeffrey Rosen – professor of law, legal editor at The New Republic
 Jonathan Turley – Shapiro Chair for Public Interest Law and frequent guest on news programs

Mathematics
 John B. Conway – professor of mathematics

Medicine
 William DeVries – first surgeon to perform a successful permanent artificial heart implantation
 Richard Restak – clinical professor of neurology
 Paul Brindley – Professor of Microbiology, Immunology, and Tropical Medicine
 Ferid Murad – University Professor, Nobel Laureate
 Vanessa Northington Gamble – University Professor, chaired the Tuskegee Syphilis Study Legacy Committee under then-President Bill Clinton

Political Management
Political Management 
•	Mark Kennedy – business executive, congressman, presidential appointee, introduced shapeholders to business strategy

Public Policy and Public Administration 

 Kathryn Newcomer –  author and academic 
 Edward Berkowitz – historian and presidential adviser
 Marcus Raskin – social critic and activist
 Christopher H. Sterling – media historian
 Stephen Joel Trachtenberg – President Emeritus of the George Washington University

Sciences 

 Dr. Lisa Bowleg - Professor of Applied Social Psychology

Others
 Eric H. Cline – professor of archaeology
 Anthony Yezer – professor of economics

Past faculty
 Moudud Ahmed – former Prime Minister of Bangladesh
 Ruth Aaronson Bari – mathematician known for her work in graph theory and homomorphisms
 Stephen Biddle – scholar and author on U.S. defense strategy
 Chrystelle Trump Bond – former lecturer of dance, choreographer, dance historian, and author
 Judith Butler – former professor of philosophy
 David Josiah Brewer – former Associate Justice of the United States Supreme Court
 Letitia Woods Brown – (1971–1976) historian
 Robert J. Callahan – current Ambassador to Nicaragua, former SMPA professor
 Vikram Chandra – author of Sacred Games and winner of the Commonwealth Writers Prize
 Nathaniel C. Comfort – former researcher in the Department of History
 William J. Crowe – former professor of international affairs, Chairman of the Joint Chiefs of Staff, United States Ambassador to the United Kingdom
 Thomas J. Dodd, Jr. – former adjunct professor, former United States Ambassador to Uruguay and to Costa Rica
 Willis Van Devanter – former Associate Justice of the United States Supreme Court
 George Gamow (1934–1954) – physicist and cosmologist
 Waldemar J. Gallman – former United States Ambassador to Iraq and United States Ambassador to Poland
 Gregory G. Garre – law professor, former United States Solicitor General
 Alan Grayson – lecturer in Government Contracts Program, former member of the U.S. House of Representatives
 John Marshall Harlan – former Associate Justice of the United States Supreme Court
 Howard Lincoln Hodgkins – University president, 1921–1923
 Cecil Jacobson – rogue fertility doctor
 Edward P. Jones – Pulitzer Prize-winning author
 Christopher Kojm – chairman of the National Intelligence Council
 William Kovacic – chairman of the Federal Trade Commission, former professor of government contracts law
 Albert Freeman Africanus King – professor of obstetrics
 S. M. Krishna – current Minister of External Affairs of India
 Ken Lay – former assistant professor, former Chairman and CEO of Enron
 Joseph LeBaron – former Elliott School faculty, current Ambassador to Qatar, former Ambassador to Mauritania
 Blake R. Van Leer – president of Georgia Tech, U.S. Army colonel, inventor, and civil rights advocate
 John Logsdon – member of Columbia Accident Investigation Board, NASA Advisory Council
 William H. Luers – former visiting lecturer, former Ambassador to Venezuela, to Czechoslovakia
 Josiah Meigs – professor of experimental philosophy in the early 19th century
 William Matthew Merrick – former congressman from Maryland, former professor of law
 Andrew A. Michta
 John Miller – former congressman from Washington
 Charles Munroe – former chair of the Department of Chemistry, discoverer of the Munroe effect
 Stanton J. Peelle – former Congressman from Indiana and chief justice of the United States Court of Claims, former professor of law
 Randall R. Rader – former law professor, current federal judge on the United States Court of Appeals for the Federal Circuit
 Walter Reed – Medical School instructor, leading disease researcher and physician
 James N. Rosenau – former president of the International Studies Association
 Pedro Rossello – professor of global health, former governor of Puerto Rico
 Howard Sachar – Jewish historian
 Dr. Thomas Sewall – anatomist and founding member of medical department
 Lee Sigelman – former editor of the American Political Science Review
 Peter Plympton Smith – former Congressman from Vermont, former Dean of the Graduate School of Education and Human Development
 John W. Snow – former United States Secretary of the Treasury, former professor of law, as well as graduate
 Stephen Solarz – former congressman from New York
 William Strong – former Associate Justice of the United States Supreme Court
 Edward Teller (1935–1941) – nuclear physicist and father of the hydrogen bomb
 Vincent du Vigneaud – biochemist who headed the Biochemistry Department at the George Washington University School of Medicine, recipient of the Nobel Prize in Chemistry in 1955
 Lowell P. Weicker, Jr. – former U.S. senator from Connecticut and former professor of law
 Robert Work – Undersecretary of the Navy

Board of trustees
 Josiah Meigs – original member
 Return J. Meigs, Jr. – former Governor of Ohio, former US Senator, original member
 Thomas Sewall – original member and Professor
 Luther Rice – original member
 Burgiss Allison – Chaplain of the United States House of Representatives, original member
 Spencer Houghton Cone – Chaplain of the United States House of Representatives, original member
 Obadiah B. Brown – Chaplain of the United States House of Representatives, original member
 Amos Kendall – former United States Postmaster General, former President of the Board
 John Quincy Adams – former President of the United States, former member
 Ulysses S. Grant – former President of the United States, honorary, former member
 Alexander Graham Bell – inventor, former member
 Ulysses S. Grant III – Major General in the United States Army, grandson of President of the United States Ulysses S. Grant, former university Vice President and Trustee
 William Wilson Corcoran – former
 Bennett Champ Clark – alumnus, former U.S. Senator, former member
 Lewis Strauss – former United States Secretary of Commerce, former member
 Phil Graham – former co-owner of The Washington Post, former member
 J. Edgar Hoover – alumnus, 1st Director of the Federal Bureau of Investigation, former member
 Margaret Truman – alumna, daughter of United States President Harry Truman, former member
 Melville Bell Grosvenor – former president of the National Geographic Society and editor of National Geographic Magazine, former member
 Jacob Burns – alumnus, former member
 David M. Kennedy – alumnus, former United States Secretary of Treasury, former member
 Melvin R. Laird – former United States Secretary of Defense, former member
 Sharon Percy Rockefeller – wife of U.S. Senator Jay Rockefeller, former member
 Eric Holder – Attorney General of the United States, former member
 John Warner – former U.S. Senator, former member
 Mark Warner – alumnus, U.S. Senator, former member
 Daniel Inouye – alumnus, U.S. Senator, former member
 Robert H. Smith – former member
 Charles Taylor Manatt – alumnus, former Ambassador to the Dominican Republic, former Chairman of the Democratic National Committee, former Chairman of the Board
 Ted Lerner – alumnus, billionaire developer and owner of the Washington Nationals, former member
 Randy Levine – alumnus, President of the New York Yankees, current member
 Robert Tanenbaum – owner of the Washington Nationals, current member

Presidents

Notes

External links

Official website
The GW and Foggy Bottom Historical Encyclopedia

Faculty

ar:جامعة جورج واشنطن
cs:George Washington University
de:George Washington University
es:Universidad George Washington
fr:Université George Washington
ka:ჯორჯ ვაშინგტონის უნივერსიტეტი
nl:George Washington-universiteit
ja:ジョージ・ワシントン大学
no:George Washington University
pt:Universidade George Washington
fi:George Washingtonin yliopisto
zh:喬治華盛頓大學